Magnús Aron Hallgrímsson (born 23 March 1976) is an Icelandic athlete. He competed in the men's discus throw at the 2000 Summer Olympics.

References

1976 births
Living people
Athletes (track and field) at the 2000 Summer Olympics
Magnús Aron Hallgrímsson
Magnús Aron Hallgrímsson
Place of birth missing (living people)